John Mordecai Podhoretz (born April 18, 1961) is an American writer. He is the editor of Commentary magazine, a columnist for the New York Post, the author of several books on politics, and a former speechwriter for Presidents Ronald Reagan and George H. W. Bush.

Early life and education
Podhoretz was born to a Jewish family in New York City, the younger son of conservative journalists Norman Podhoretz and Midge Decter. He has two older half-siblings from his mother's first marriage. He grew up on the Upper West Side in New York City. He attended Columbia Grammar and Preparatory School and he received a bachelor's degree from the University of Chicago in 1982. In 1987, he became a five-time champion on the game show Jeopardy!

Career 
Podhoretz was a speechwriter for former U.S. Presidents Ronald Reagan and George H. W. Bush. He was special assistant to White House Drug Czar William Bennett. He co-founded the White House Writers Group, a public-relations firm in Washington, D.C. Podhoretz was a consultant for the popular television series The West Wing, including the controversial episode "Gaza" in season five, first broadcast on May 12, 2004.

Podhoretz has contributed to a number of conservative publications, including National Review and the Weekly Standard, where he was a movie critic and was the magazine's deputy editor. He was also a consulting editor at ReganBooks, a former imprint of HarperCollins. Podhoretz has a regular column at the New York Post. He has also appeared on television, including Fox News, CNN's Reliable Sources, MSNBC, and The McLaughlin Group (in the chair usually occupied by conservative Tony Blankley). He has also worked at Time, the Washington Times, Insight on the News, and U.S. News & World Report. Podhoretz was a contributor to The Corner, a group blog run by National Review.

At The Weekly Standard, one staff member said, Podhoretz's "arrogance and egotism had a psychological effect people can't quite believe." At The Washington Times a colleague reported, he was "permanently frozen in juvenalia." Glenn Garvin, the Central American bureau chief of the Miami Herald, once said that at the Times, Podhoretz "constantly complained that his brilliance wasn't appreciated." 

On January 1, 2009, Podhoretz became editor of Commentary, succeeding Neal Kozodoy.

Political commentary

George W. Bush
Podhoretz was a staunch supporter of President George W. Bush. His 2004 book Bush Country: How George W. Bush Became the First Great Leader of the 21st Century---While Driving Liberals Insane called Bush "the first great leader of the 21st century". When some conservatives denounced Bush's immigration plan, Podhoretz wrote that Bush's "efforts on behalf of conservative causes—from faith-based policies to stem-cell research to a strict-constructionist judiciary to entitlement reform and massive tax cuts—have all fallen down the memory hole".

Israel
Podhoretz is emphatic in his defense of Israel in its conflicts with its Arab neighbors. When pundit Pat Buchanan called Israel's actions in the 2006 Lebanon War "un-Christian", Podhoretz wrote: "You want to know what anti-Semitism is? When Pat Buchanan calls Israel's military action 'un-Christian.' That's anti-Semitism."

Iraq War
Podhoretz has supported the Iraq War from its inception until the present. In his book, Bush Country, he wrote. In a July 25, 2006 column for the New York Post that discussed the Israel-Lebanon conflict, Podhoretz advocated a more Machiavellian policy in Iraq, writing: "What if the tactical mistake we made in Iraq was that we didn't kill enough Sunnis in the early going to intimidate them and make them so afraid of us they would go along with anything? Wasn't the survival of Sunni men between the ages of 15 and 35 the reason there was an insurgency and the basic cause of the sectarian violence now?" In a December 2006 column, he wrote, "The most common cliché about the war in Iraq is now this: We didn't have a plan, and now everything is in chaos... This is entirely wrong. We did have a plan—the problem is that the plan didn't work... We thought a political process inside Iraq would make a military push toward victory against a tripartite foe—Saddamist remnants, foreign terrorists and anti-American Shiites—unnecessary... The only plan that will work is a plan to face the tripartite enemy—the Saddamists, the foreign terrorists and the Shiite sectarians—and bring them to heel. Kill as many bad guys as we can, with as many troops as we can muster."

Immigration
In disagreement with several writers at National Review and conservatives in general, Podhoretz has aggressively favored a more open immigration policy for the United States. He wrote: "I said merely what I feel deeply—which is that, as a Jew, I have great difficulty supporting a blanket policy of immigration restriction because of what happened to the Jewish people after 1924 and the unwillingness of the United States to take Jews in." Podhoretz was generally supportive of President Bush's proposals for a guest worker program and a path to citizenship for certain illegal immigrants in the U.S.

In November 2007, comments on Commentary's blog "Contentions", Podhoretz attacked his former colleague at National Review Online, Mark Krikorian, for what Podhoretz called a "vision of a walled-off America primarily under threat from border-crossing immigrants." Podhoretz attempted to connect Krikorian's stance on immigration to an isolationist foreign policy. In response, Krikorian called Podhoretz a "pedantic bore" who had no "actual arguments" against Krikorian's position on immigration.

Jill Carroll incident
On March 30, 2006, Podhoretz was criticized by various bloggers for posting the following comment on National Review Online approximately three hours after hostage Jill Carroll's release from her captors: "It's wonderful that she's free, but after watching someone who was a hostage for three months say on television she was well-treated because she wasn't beaten or killed—while being dressed in the garb of a modest Muslim woman rather than the non-Muslim woman she actually is—I expect there will be some Stockholm syndrome talk in the coming days."

Within days of Carroll's release, a video of Carroll slamming the "occupation" of Iraq and praising the insurgents as "good people fighting an honorable fight" appeared on an Islamist website. However, Carroll subsequently released a statement through The Christian Science Monitor's website stating that she participated in the video only because she feared for her life and because her captors said they would let her go if she participated to their satisfaction. Carroll called her captors "criminals, at best" and said she remained "deeply angry" with them.

On April 1, 2006, Podhoretz wrote the following on National Review Online: "For writing these predictive words, which were entirely accurate, I've been pilloried all over the blogosphere. Weird, especially in light of Jill Carroll's statement today, which was an effort to address and quiet precisely the kind of talk I predicted would take place."

Conflicts with John Derbyshire
In response to assertions by National Review writer John Derbyshire that the victims of the Virginia Tech massacre should have been more forceful in defending themselves, Podhoretz wrote: "The notion that a human being or group of human beings holding no weapon whatever should somehow 'fight back' against someone calmly executing other people right in front of their eyes is ludicrous beyond belief, irrational beyond bounds, and tasteless beyond the limits of reason. 'Why didn't anyone rush the guy?' Derb asks. Gee, I don't know. Because he was executing people? Because if you rush a guy with a gun, he shoots you in the head the way he executed the teachers in each classroom?" Podhoretz went on to ridicule Derbyshire's claim that he was touching a "third rail" by raising a subject nobody else wanted to discuss.

Podhoretz has frequently clashed with Derbyshire on immigration policy and other issues.

Other commentary
Podhoretz often writes about popular culture, and was called the "resident pop culture expert" at National Review Online by Jonah Goldberg.  Dennis Miller has called Podhoretz his "favorite movie reviewer."  Podhoretz has written that "it doesn't make sense to judge pop culture by its politics." In 1999 a column he wrote for The New York Post, "A Conversation in Hell", which featured a conversation between Satan and Joseph P. Kennedy, Sr., was killed because of its controversial nature.

Personal life 
Podhoretz's first marriage, to Elisabeth Marie Hickey, in 1997, ended in divorce after less than three months. In 2002, he married Ayala Rae Cohen, a former co-producer for Saturday Night Live, who works for International Creative Management (ICM Partners). They have two daughters and a son. Podhoretz is related by marriage to the diplomat, lawyer and political scientist Elliott Abrams who was pardoned for crimes in connection to the Iran–Contra affair.

Notes

Books
 
 (1993) Hell of a Ride: Backstage at the White House Follies 1989–1993, New York: Simon & Schuster, 
 (1993) A Passion for Truth: The Selected Writings of Eric Breindel, New York: HarperCollins Publishers, editor 
 (2004) Bush Country: How Dubya Became a Great President While Driving Liberals Insane, New York: St. Martin's Press, 
 (2007) Can She Be Stopped?: Hillary Clinton Will Be the Next President of the United States Unless..., New York: Crown Forum,

External links 
 The Corner at National Review Online
 "Oedipus and Podhoretz", an article from New York by Hanna Rosin
 

American political writers
American male non-fiction writers
American speechwriters
American columnists
American people of Polish-Jewish descent
Jewish American writers
Jeopardy! contestants
1961 births
Living people
University of Chicago alumni
The Weekly Standard people
The American Spectator people
Reagan administration personnel
New York (state) Republicans
The Washington Times people
People from the Upper West Side
Columbia Grammar & Preparatory School alumni
Speechwriters for presidents of the United States
Writers from New York City